The Keshav Puram metro station is located on the Red Line of the Delhi Metro. It is located in the Keshav Puram locality of North West Delhi district of Delhi.

Station layout

Facilities

List of available ATM at Keshav Puram metro station are

Entry/Exit

Connections

No connectivity at this station for other lines. Nearest connecting stations are INDERLOK,
for Green Line, and KASHMERE GATE for YELLOW LINE and VIOLET LINE.

See also
List of Delhi Metro stations
Transport in Delhi
Delhi Metro Rail Corporation
Delhi Suburban Railway
List of rapid transit systems in India
Delhi Transport Corporation
List of Metro Systems

References

External links

 Delhi Metro Rail Corporation Ltd. (Official site)
 Delhi Metro Annual Reports
 
 UrbanRail.Net – descriptions of all metro systems in the world, each with a schematic map showing all stations.

Delhi Metro stations
Railway stations opened in 2004
North West Delhi district
Railway stations in North West Delhi district